Leonid Davidovich Gissen (28 June 1931 – 7 February 2005) was a Russian rower who competed for the Soviet Union in the 1952 Summer Olympics and in the 1956 Summer Olympics.

In 1952, he won the silver medal as crew member of the Soviet boat in the eights event.

Four years later he was part of the Soviet boat which was eliminated in the semi-final of the eight competition.

References 
 
 Leonid Gissen's obituary 

1931 births
2005 deaths
Russian male rowers
Soviet male rowers
Olympic rowers of the Soviet Union
Rowers at the 1952 Summer Olympics
Rowers at the 1956 Summer Olympics
Olympic silver medalists for the Soviet Union
Olympic medalists in rowing
Medalists at the 1952 Summer Olympics
European Rowing Championships medalists